Timea Bacsinszky and Kristina Barrois were the defeating champions, but chose not to participate this year.

Mona Barthel and Laura Siegemund won the title, defeating Anabel Medina Garrigues and Arantxa Parra Santonja in the final, 6–2, 7–6(7–2).

Seeds

Draw

References 
 Draw

2015 Doubles
BGL Luxembourg Open - Doubles
2015 in Luxembourgian tennis